The Synagogue of Vesoul was the principal Jewish place of worship in the city of Vesoul, in Haute-Saône, (France). The building was erected in 1875 and classified as a historic monument in 1984. In 2011 the organization that owned the building, Les Restos du Coeur, decided to sell it.

References

Vesoul
Synagogues in France